The Mack AC was a heavy cargo truck designed in the 1910s by the American manufacturer Mack Trucks. Introduced in 1916, the Mack AC saw extensive service during the First World War with the British and American armed forces, in British service it was given the nickname the "Bulldog" which led to Mack adopting the Bulldog as its corporate symbol.

Development

Mack introduced the AC model in 1916 to replace their Mack Senior model which dated from 1905. Mack's chief engineer, Edward Hewitt, is credited with designing the AC which on its introduction was so innovative it had 18 patents on various aspects of its design. When introduced, the AC complimented the smaller AB, another Hewitt design, that was introduced in 1914 to replace Mack's older Junior model.

Design
The AC was powered by a pair-cast 4-cylinder petrol engine that delivered  (5x6 471.2ci). The engine had an aluminum crankcase which included inspection ports, and a governor built into the camshaft timing gear; it was driven through a three-speed transmission with a clutch brake. From 1936 Buda and Cummins diesel engines were also offered in the AC. One of the most distinctive features of the AC was its hood and dashboard mounted radiator (mounted behind the engine) which was covered by a squared off bonnet of a coal scuttle pattern which had a small circular grille at the front containing the Mack emblem, all of which gave the model its distinctive appearance.

The AC's pressed chrome-nickel steel chassis was heat-treated for durability.  Chain drive was used to drive the rear wheels while the front axle was made of drop-forged alloy steel for extra strength. Like most heavy trucks of the era, the AC used solid tires initially, although towards the end of its production run many were delivered with pneumatic tires. The AC had an all-steel cab with an optional metal roof. One innovation introduced in the AC was the positioning of the steering wheel at a 45-degree angle which greatly improved driver comfort.

Variants
The Mack AK was a shaft driven version of the AC, produced between 1927 and 1936.

The Mack AP was a version of the AC with a 6-cylinder engine that was produced between 1926 and 1938.

The Mack AL was a version of the AC model and designed specifically for distribution operations and firefighting equipment. This model differed by low mounted cabin and low frame height. Total of only 57 such vehicles were made, produced between 1927 and 1929.

Use
The Mack AC saw extensive service with the militaries of the United States and the United Kingdom during the First World War. During the war Mack delivered approximately 4,500 ACs to the US government who adopted it as a standard type, using 3, 5 and 7 ton versions. Additionally, approximately 2,000 ACs were delivered to the British military during the war.  It proved to be extremely popular in British service with British troops appreciating the AC's tough characteristics and reliability; the AC had a reputation for withstanding the roughest treatment and extreme overloading. British soldiers nicknamed the AC the "Bulldog", a reference to the model's tenacity and its stub nose, and the nickname was later also adopted by US troops. As a result of this nickname earned by the AC on the Western Front, all Mack trucks were often referred to as "Bulldogs", and in 1922 the company adopted the Bulldog as its corporate symbol.

The AC proved to be an extremely enduring model for Mack and it remained in production until 1938, with a total of 40,299 produced, along with 2,819 AKs and 285 APs. The AC was widely used in construction and road-building, with many used in the construction of the Hoover Dam. The AC was among the strongest trucks ever made, and solid-tire ACs built in the 1920s were still a common sight in American cities in the 1950s, and not unknown in the 1960s. The AC's chassis, along with that of the AP, was a popular choice for fire engines, in both rigid and articulated forms.

See also
 Mack Trucks in military service

Notes

References

External links

 

AC
Vehicles introduced in 1916
Military trucks of the United States
Military vehicles introduced in the 1910s
Motor vehicles manufactured in the United States
World War I vehicles of the United Kingdom